Frontina laeta is a species of fly in the family Tachinidae. This species can be found in most of Europe.

Bibliography
O'Hara, James E.; Shima, Hiroshi; Zhang, Chuntian (2009). "Annotated Catalogue of the Tachinidae (Insecta: Diptera) of China" (PDF). Zootaxa (Auckland, New Zealand: Magnolia Press) 2190: 1–236. ISSN 1175-5334. Retrieved 2011-02-24.
Chandler, Peter J. (1998). Checklists of Insects of the British Isles (New Series) Part 1: Diptera. Handbooks for the Identification of British Insects. New Series 12 (1) (London: Royal Entomological Society of London). pp. 1–234. .

References

Exoristinae
Frontina
Diptera of Europe
Insects described in 1824